4NYC is an album by Jordan Rudess which was recorded live September 24, 2001 and released  September 10, 2002.

The album came about as part of Rudess's reaction to the September 11, 2001 terrorist attacks.  In an effort to raise money for the American Red Cross and to help ease the pain associated with the great loss he and the people of New York felt, he and his wife organized a benefit concert.  The  tracks comprise performances from that concert and improvisations done in Rudess's studio the following week.

Track listing
All tracks written by Jordan Rudess.

*Performed at the Helen Hayes Performing Arts Center, Nyack, New York, September 24, 2001. All other tracks are studio recordings.

Personnel
Jordan Rudess – Steinway grand piano, Kurzweil 2600 Synthesizer, and Korg Karma Synthesizer

References

Charity albums
2002 live albums
Jordan Rudess albums